Han Guang (March 1912 – September 27, 2008) was a People's Republic of China politician. He was born in Qiqihar, Heilongjiang Province. He was governor of his home province.

1912 births
2008 deaths
People's Republic of China politicians from Heilongjiang
Chinese Communist Party politicians from Heilongjiang
Governors of Heilongjiang
People from Qiqihar